Hamari Adhuri Kahani is a 2015 Indian Hindi-language romantic drama film directed by Mohit Suri and produced by Mahesh Bhatt under the banner Vishesh Films and Fox Star Studios. The film stars Emraan Hashmi, Vidya Balan, and Rajkummar Rao. It is based on the love story of Bhatt's parents, Nanabhai Bhatt, Shirin Mohammad Ali and his stepmother. 

The film was released worldwide on 12 June 2015 receiving mixed reviews from critics.

Plot
The movie opens with a woman Vasudha (Vidya Balan) stepping off a bus. An elderly man, Hari, sees a psychiatrist about hallucinations of his wife. His daughter-in-law takes him to his wife's funeral. There, he steals her ashes and leaves a diary for his son.

The story jumps to the past, where Vasudha is a single mother whose husband has been missing for five years. Bound to tradition, she has been waiting for him since he left her. Vasudha meets Aarav Ruparel (Emraan Hashmi) in one of his hotels, where she works as a floral arranger. Vasudha comes to save him in a mock fire drill, and he offers her a job in his hotel in Dubai, which she refuses at first. However, she later gets to know from police that her husband Hari (Rajkumar Rao) murdered five American journalists and is a member of a terrorist group. Worried for her son's future, she accepts the job offer given by Aarav.

Despite knowing about Vasudha's past and her son, Aarav falls in love with her. He tells her about his mother who was a cabaret singer and a single parent, and how she fell in love with a man who tried to commit suicide for failing to save them from poverty. Vasudha shuns his feelings, saying that she belongs to someone else. At his request, she meets Aarav's mother and finally accepts Aarav's love. Vasudha encounters Hari at home, and tells him about Aarav. Hari storms out in anger and is arrested and jailed for being a wanted criminal. Vasudha asks Aarav to save Hari as he is innocent. Aarav tries to save Hari by bribing the home minister, but he reveals that Hari himself admitted to his crime. Vasudha refuses to marry Aarav because Hari's action tells her that he sacrificed his life for them to be together. It is then revealed to Aarav that Hari deliberately accepted his crime so that Vasudha will live in guilt, thinking Hari sacrificed himself for their love.

In order to free Vasudha out of her guilt, Aarav travels to Bastar, where Hari is accused of killing, to prove his innocence. Aarav meets Father Dayal, who reveals Hari's innocence. On the way back to Mumbai, Aarav smells the scent of the flowers that caused him to meet Vasudha. Following the scent, he goes into the jungle, not knowing that the place has mines. He accidentally steps on one of the mines. Realizing his predicament, Aarav smiles just before taking his foot off. Vasudha receives the news of Aarav's death and leaves Hari, who searches for her for two years. After finding her, she reveals to him that she knows about his fake sacrifice and tells him that she is not afraid of any tradition. He warns her that she will come back to him one day. Hari waits for Vasudha twenty-one years in vain.

Back in the present, the old woman from the bus, Vasudha, wants to be reunited with Aarav where he died. Hari takes Vasudha's ashes to scatter them in the forest of Bastar, where Aarav died. Thus, Aarav and Vasudha reunite after death.

Cast
 Emraan Hashmi as Aarav Ruparel 
 Vidya Balan as Vasudha Prasad 
 Rajkummar Rao as Hari Prasad
 Sara Khan as Naila
 Suhasini Mulay as Mrs. Prasad
 Narendra Jha as ACP Patil
 Prabal Panjabi as Apurva 
 Uday Chandra as Jeevan Rane
 Madhurima Tuli as Avni Prasad (cameo appearance)
 Namit Das as an adult Saanjh Prasad (cameo appearance)
 Amala Akkineni as Rohini Ruparel (cameo appearance)

Production

Development
On 23 October 2013, Vishesh Films and Fox Star Studios extended their association and announced a three-film deal, City Lights, Hamari Adhuri Kahani and Mr. X. It was then revealed that the film will be directed by Mohit Suri, and will release on 7 November 2013. Initially it was decided the cast will start filming in May–June 2014, however the dates shifted to October 2014, owing to Emraan Hashmi's son's illness. In February 2014, in an interview with Bombay Times, producer of the film Mahesh Bhatt revealed that the story of the film will be written by himself and it is based on the love story of his parents, Nanabhai Bhatt, Shirin Mohammad Ali and his stepmother. In an interview with Mumbai Mirror, Suri said Vidya Balan had to lose weight for the film and get into shape. Before the development of the film, rumours spread that Balan opted out of the film "as she needs some time for herself" and her character is replaced by Shraddha Kapoor. On 14 March 2014, Bhatt refutes the news and confirmed that Balan "is still on board". On 13 June 2014, reports finalising the release date of film – 12 June 2015 – was released.

Casting
The leading cast of Emraan Hashmi and Vidya Balan was finalised on 23 October 2013, marking their third collaboration after The Dirty Picture (2011) and Ghanchakkar (2013). On 12 February 2014, it was confirmed that Rajkummar Rao will be joining the cast of the film. On 6 October 2014, it was suggested that Rao will be playing the role of the husband of the character portrayed by Balan, to which he confirmed that he plays a "pivotal role but not in terms of screen time". On 15 December 2014, it was reported Amala Akkineni will be seen in a cameo appearance in the film, and she will be singing and enacting the title song of the film. On 26 December 2014, it was revealed that Sara Khan will also be joining the cast of the film.

Filming 
Initially, the first schedule was planned to be widely shot in Cape Town, South Africa. Filming began in Kolkata on 2 October 2014. A portion of the climax scene of the film was shot on 3 October 2014, where Balan and Hashmi joined the immersion processions on the city's crowded roads overlooking the Howrah Bridge. The other portion of the scene was shot on 5 January 2015, inside a bardy style old house in Kolkata.

After wrapping shooting in Kolkata, it was reported that the crew of the film started filming in Dubai for a total of sixteen days. The schedule was planned for a month back but shifted due to the weather conditions in the area. On 20 October 2014, Balan and Hashmi were spotted shooting scenes at Dubai International Airport and further shoots took place around the city, including on Sheikh Zayed Road, Business Bay, Heritage Village, and other locations around Bur Dubai, Jumeirah and Dubai Marina. After Dubai schedule, the team resumed their shoot in Cape Town before visiting back to Dubai for a further two days of shooting. Most of the scenes for the two days shooting took place in Meena Bazaar along with its views of the dhows on Dubai Creek.

The final scene of the United Arab Emirates schedule, was shot on 17 November 2014, in Miracle Garden and Suri added that though the city was generally treated for its high-tech buildings and modern landscapes, he wanted to romanticise it and show its softer side. The film also features Abu Dhabi's Qasr Al Sarb desert resort. The team shot the rest of the film in Mumbai. The shooting for the film was completed during the mid-January 2015.

Soundtrack

Music for the film is given by Jeet Gannguli, Mithoon, Ami Mishra and Zubeen Garg. The song "Yeh Kaisi Jagah" was recorded at Zubeen's studio Sound & Silence, Zubeen programmed track music and help to compose the song. Lyrics are penned by Rashmi Virag, Sayeed Quadri, Kunaal Vermaa. "Zaroori Tha" song from the film was originally a soundtrack of singer Rahat Fateh Ali Khan's album Back 2 Love. The album was named "Best Bollywood Album of June 2015" by Deccan Music.

Release
Hamari Adhuri Kahani released worldwide on 12 June 2015.

Reception 
Meena Iyer of The Times of India rated the film 2.5 out of 5 stars, stated that the film "lacks soul" but praised the lead cast and described music as "soothing balm".

Awards and nominations

References

External links
 
 

2015 films
Films set in Chhattisgarh
Films scored by Jeet Ganguly
Films scored by Mithoon
Films scored by Ami Mishra
Films scored by Zubeen Garg
Films set in Kolkata
Films set in Dubai
Films set in Mumbai
Films shot in Kolkata
Films shot in South Africa
Films shot in Dubai
Films shot in Abu Dhabi
2010s Hindi-language films
Indian romantic drama films
2015 romantic drama films
Fox Star Studios films
Films directed by Mohit Suri
Films about adultery in India